Gamgul is a high-altitude wildlife sanctuary located in the Bhandal valley in Salooni tehsil of Chamba, Himachal Pradesh. The union territory of Jammu and Kashmir adjoins it at the northern end. It's said that this is the only sanctuary located in Himachal Pradesh that has reported Kashmir stag.

The sanctuary plays host to a small populations of Musk deer, Himalayan tahr, and pheasants. Also, one can spot number of colourful birds in the area. The vegetation is typical to the higher altitude area, and the landscape is interspersed with deodar forests, coniferous forest and alpine pastures.

References

Chamba district
Bird sanctuaries of Himachal Pradesh
Protected areas established in 1962
1962 establishments in Himachal Pradesh
Geography of Chamba district